Jean Allard may refer to:

Jean René Allard (born 1930), politician from Manitoba
Jean Victor Allard (1913–1996), military chief in Canada